Tecumseh is a city in and the county seat of Johnson County, Nebraska, United States. The population was 1,677 at the 2010 census.

History 
Tecumseh was originally called Frances, and under the latter name was established in 1856. The label of Frances has long been falsely attributed as the name of the wife of Col. Richard M Johnson, the namesake of Johnson County. Johnson's only marriage was to Julia Chinn, a common-law spouse. Julia Chinn, was an octoroon slave (one-eighth African, seven-eighths European in ancestry), born into slavery around 1790. Some historians have accepted the possibility that the legislature intended to name the county seat after Francis Burt, the first Governor of the Nebraska Territory. Shortly after being founded, the name was changed to Tecumseh after the Native American Chief said to have been killed by Johnson during the Battle of the Thames. The Nebraska Territorial Legislature established Tecumseh as the county seat in February 1857.

Geography
Tecumseh is located at  (40.370061, -96.191639).

Climate

Demographics

2010 census
As of the census of 2010, 1,677 people, 722 households, and 447 families resided in the city. The 887 housing units averaged . The racial makeup of the city was 82.5% White, 0.4% African American, 0.1% Native American, 3.2% Asian, 12.9% from other races, and 0.8% from two or more races. Hispanics or Latinos of any race were 16.2% of the population.

Of the 722 households, 27.4% had children under the age of 18 living with them, 48.9% were married couples living together, 9.1% had a female householder with no husband present, 3.9% had a male householder with no wife present, and 38.1% were not families; 33.2% of all households were made up of individuals, and 17.6% had someone living alone who was 65 years of age or older. The average household size was 2.25 and the average family size was 2.86.

The median age in the city was 44.8 years; 22.1% of residents were under the age of 18; 6.5% were between the ages of 18 and 24; 21.5% were from 25 to 44; 26.5% were from 45 to 64; and 23.3% were 65 years of age or older. The gender makeup of the city was 47.9% male and 52.1% female.

2000 census
As of the census of 2000,  1,716 people, 729 households, and 446 families resided in the city. The population density was 1,159.5 people per square mile (447.7/km). The 854 housing units averaged 577.0 per square mile (222.8/km). The racial makeup of the city was 86.36% White, 0.06% African American, 0.58% Native American, 5.59% Asian, 5.07% from other races, and 2.33% from two or more races. Hispanics or Latinos of any race were 6.53% of the population.

Of the 729 households, 28.8% had children under the age of 18 living with them, 50.9% were married couples living together, 7.0% had a female householder with no husband present, and 38.7% were not families. About 34.6% of all households were made up of individuals, and 21.1% had someone living alone who was 65 years of age or older. The average household size was 2.27 and the average family size was 2.93.

In the city, the population was distributed as 24.0% under the age of 18, 6.1% from 18 to 24, 24.4% from 25 to 44, 20.6% from 45 to 64, and 25.0% who were 65 years of age or older. The median age was 42 years. For every 100 females, there were 82.6 males. For every 100 females age 18 and over, there were 79.9 males.

As of 2000, the median income for a household in the city was $31,844, and for a family was $42,337. Males had a median income of $27,228 versus $19,896 for females. The per capita income for the city was $16,194. About 8.4% of families and 11.9% of the population were below the poverty line, including 17.0% of those under age 18 and 10.1% of those age 65 or over.

In the media
The town was used largely for the setting of the miniseries Amerika, which depicted life in a small American town after a successful takeover by the Soviet Union.

Tecumseh Airport
Tecumseh is home to the Tecumseh Airport, a private-use airport with one 3500 x 75 foot concrete runway that was resurfaced in 2008. In 2009, the airport expanded to include rent-able hangars. The airport can service any plane up to light twin-engine aircraft.

Education
Tecumseh is in Johnson County Central Public Schools.

It was in Tecumseh Public Schools until 2007.

Notable people
 Dennis Aust, baseball player
 Betsy Baker, oldest ever verified person in the world at the time of her death in 1955 at the age of 113
Tony Davis, professional football player
 Peirson M. Hall, a federal judge who lived in a Tecumseh orphanage
 Jennie Florella Holmes, temperance activist
 Walter Kiechel III, managing editor of Fortune magazine, author of The Lords of Strategy, born in Tecumseh
 Virgil A. Martin, Los Angeles,  California, City Council member (1927–31), born in Tecumseh
 Ronald Schafer, electrical engineer and author of many textbooks on digital signal processing and audio analysis
 Bob Stitt, head football coach at the University of Montana
 Clyde Summers, labor lawyer and law professor at the Yale Law School and University of Pennsylvania Law School, subject of In re Summers
 Roy E. York, Minnesota state legislator and farmer

See also
 National Register of Historic Places listings in Johnson County, Nebraska

References

External links
 City of Tecumseh
 Johnson County Place Names

Cities in Johnson County, Nebraska
Cities in Nebraska
County seats in Nebraska